John "Babbacombe" Lee (15 August 1864 – 19 March 1945) was an Englishman famous for surviving three attempts to hang him for murder. Born in Abbotskerswell, Devon, Lee served in the Royal Navy, and was a known thief.

In 1885, he was convicted of the murder of his employer, Emma Keyse, at her home at Babbacombe Bay near Torquay on 15 November 1884, with a knife. The evidence was weak and circumstantial, amounting to little more than Lee having been the only male in the house at the time of the murder, his previous criminal record, and being found with an unexplained cut on his arm. Despite this and his claim of innocence, he was sentenced to hang. After he survived three attempts at hanging, his sentence was commuted to life imprisonment. He became popularly known as "the man they couldn't hang".

Attempted execution and aftermath 
On 23 February 1885, three attempts were made to carry out Lee's execution at Exeter Prison. All ended in failure, as the trapdoor of the scaffold failed to open despite being carefully tested by the executioner, James Berry, beforehand. The medical officer refused to take any further part in the proceedings, and they were stopped.

Berry provides a detailed account of the failed execution in his memoirs, My Experiences as an Executioner, noting that the trapdoor was adjusted with a saw and axe between the attempted executions, although in Berry's memoirs and letter to the Under-Sheriff he only mentions two attempted executions.

As a result, home secretary Sir William Harcourt commuted the sentence to life imprisonment. The Home Office ordered an investigation into the failure of the apparatus, and it was discovered that when the gallows was moved from the old infirmary into the coach house, the draw bar was slightly misaligned. As a result the hinges of the trapdoor bound and did not drop cleanly through. Lee continued to petition successive Home Secretaries and was finally released in 1907.

The only other man in history known to have survived three hanging attempts was Joseph Samuel, in September 1803.

An alternative theory, raised by Ernest Bowen-Rowlands in his book In the Light of the Law, suggests that the trap was blocked by a wooden wedge that was inserted by a prisoner working on the scaffold, and removed when the apparatus was tested. Note that Bowen-Rowlands only cites an anonymous "well-known person", citing an equally anonymous prisoner's confession, and this would contrast with Berry's reputation (noted by prison governors and surgeons) as a meticulous professional.

Later years and identifications 
After his release, Lee seems to have exploited his notoriety, supporting himself through lecturing on his life, even becoming the subject of a silent film. Accounts of his whereabouts after 1916 are somewhat confused, and one researcher even speculated that in later years there was more than one man claiming to be Lee. It was suspected that he died in the Tavistock workhouse sometime during the Second World War. However, more recent research concludes that he died in the United States under the name of "James Lee" in 1945. According to the book The Man They Could Not Hang, Lee's gravestone was located at Forest Home Cemetery, Milwaukee in 2009.

Popular culture 
 The Life Story of John Lee, or The Man They Could Not Hang, a 1912 film
 "Babbacombe" Lee, a 1971 album by Fairport Convention
The case was covered and examined in a 2021 episode of the BBC One series Murder, Mystery and My Family, in which the verdict originally reached by the jury was upheld.

Further reading
The Man They Could Not Hang: The Life Story of John Lee - Mellifont Press Ltd, 18 Henrietta Street, London / Lloyd's Weekly News, John Lee (1908) 
The Man They Could Not Hang: The Marvellous Life Story of John Lee - Arthur Westbrook Company, USA, John Lee (1908)
The Babbacombe Murder - Frank Keyse (1988) 
The Man They Could Not Hang - A. S. Walker 
The Secret of the Babbacombe Murder: The Mysterious Case of John Lee 'The Man They Could Not Hang'  - Mike Holgate (1995) 
The Man They Could Not Hang: The True Story of John Lee - History Press, Mike Holgate, Ian David Waugh (1939, 2005, 2007)

See also 
 Joseph Samuel, also referred to as "The Man They Couldn't Hang"
 Willie Francis
 List of botched executions
 The Imaginarium of Doctor Parnassus, 2009 Terry Gilliam film in which a character is revived after hanging

References

External links 
 Detailed history of the 1884 Babbacombe murder

 
1864 births
1945 deaths
19th-century English criminals
20th-century English people
People from Teignbridge (district)
English people convicted of murder
English prisoners sentenced to death
People convicted of murder by England and Wales
Place of death missing
Prisoners sentenced to death by England and Wales
Execution survivors
English expatriates in the United States
1884 murders in the United Kingdom